Keākealanikāne (1575 – 1635) (Hawaiian: Ke-ākea-lani Kāne "the male heavenly expanse") was an aliʻi nui of the island of Hawaiʻi (1605–1635). He was the sovereign of the Big Island. He is mentioned in chant Kumulipo.

During the reign of Keākealanikāne several of the more powerful of the district chiefs had assumed an attitude of comparative independence.

Life
Keākealanikāne was a son of Queen Kaikilani and Chief Kanaloakuaʻana. He succeeded on the death of his mother in 1605. He married first his sister, Aliʻi Kealiʻiokalani. His second wife was Kaleimakaliʻi and his third wife was Kalaʻaiheana (daughter of Kuaʻana-a-ʻI and Kamaka-o-ʻUmi). She was also a wife of Keawekuikaʻai.

He died ca. 1635, having had two sons and one daughter: Keawekuikaʻai by Kaleimakaliʻi,  Moanakane by Kaleiheana  and Keakamahana, Queen of Hawaiʻi by Kealiʻiokalani.

His granddaughter was Queen Keākealaniwahine.

References
Abraham Fornander, An Account of the Polynesian Race: Its Origin and Migrations, Rutland, VT: Charles E. Tuttle Company, 1969

Royalty of Hawaii (island)
 House of Līloa
1575 births
1635 deaths
17th-century monarchs in Oceania